The Nadba  is a cultural ceremonial battle cry native to the Shihuh, an Arab tribe that inhabits Ruus Al Jibal (Musandam Peninsula) in eastern Arabia. It is a famous cultural dance in the United Arab Emirates, particularly in Ras Al Khaimah. Although a battle cry, its use is not restricted during time of combat but today is commonly performed in ceremonies, weddings, feasts, and to honor guests. It is performed by a group of tribesmen, who usually pick a leader (called the Nadeeb - ) to lead the battle cry. The battle cry is performed by the leader raising his left arm across his chest to his mouth and his right arm bent above and behind his head, then straightening and bending the raised hand as he howls in an ascending and descending scale in Arabic to the lyrics of "Al Shehhi Al Mayhob" while the surrounding tribesmen, who form a circle around the leader (called Kabkub - ), chant to the lyrics of "Ho..Ho..Ho" (shortened word of Allahu). The members performing the ceremony are call Ridida.

See also
Culture of the United Arab Emirates
Video of the Nadba on YouTube

References

Emirati culture
Emirati traditions
Arab culture